Protein OS-9 is a protein that in humans is encoded by the OS9 gene.

Function 

This gene encodes a protein that is highly expressed in osteosarcomas. This protein binds to the hypoxia-inducible factor 1 (HIF-1), a key regulator of the hypoxic response and angiogenesis, and promotes the degradation of one of its subunits. Alternate transcriptional splice variants, encoding different isoforms, have been characterized.

Model organisms 

Model organisms have been used in the study of OS9 function. A conditional knockout mouse line called Os9tm1a(EUCOMM)Wtsi was generated at the Wellcome Trust Sanger Institute. Male and female animals underwent a standardized phenotypic screen to determine the effects of deletion. Additional screens performed:  - In-depth immunological phenotyping

References

Further reading 

 
 
 
 
 
 
 
 
 

Proteins
Genes